Lena Maryana Mukti (born 22 December 1962) is an Indonesian politician who is a member of the People's Representative Council.

Career
Lena Maryana Mukti was born on 22 December 1962 in Jakarta, the second child of ten.

She was elected into the People's Representative Council in 2004 following the 2004 Indonesian legislative election. once more ran in the 2014 Indonesian legislative election, as a United Development Party candidate.

References

1962 births
Living people
Members of the People's Representative Council, 2004
Members of the People's Representative Council, 2014
Women members of the People's Representative Council
20th-century Indonesian women politicians
20th-century Indonesian politicians
21st-century Indonesian women politicians
21st-century Indonesian politicians
Politicians from Jakarta